Malta has participated in the Eurovision Young Dancers (a biennial television dance competition, organised by the European Broadcasting Union) 2 times since its debut in 2015. On 7 July 2015, PBS Malta, which is responsible for Malta's participation confirmed that Malta will host the 2017 edition. However, in January 2017, the EBU announced that PBS had due to circumstances beyond their control been forced to cancel their staging of the competition. Nevertheless, they will still take part in the contest.

Participation overview

See also
Malta in the Eurovision Song Contest
Malta in the Eurovision Young Musicians
Malta in the Junior Eurovision Song Contest

References

External links 
 Eurovision Young Dancers

Countries in the Eurovision Young Dancers